Series 16 of Top Gear, a British motoring magazine and factual television programme, was broadcast in the United Kingdom on BBC Two during 2011, consisting of six episodes that were aired between 23 January and 27 February. Following the previous series, the BBC discontinued their involvement with Ben Collins on the programme, after he breached an agreement in his contract that forbid him disclosing his role as "The Stig" with the publication of his autobiography, The Man in the White Suit, in August 2010. His departure led to his replacement by a new driver by the beginning of the first episode.

This series' highlights included a comparison test of the three similar second-hand convertibles, an attempt by the presenters to create a snowplough with a combine harvester, and a crossover piece with Top Gear Australia. The sixteenth series was preceded by two specials aired in December 2010. The first on 21 December, titled "East Coast Road Trip", featured studio segments and a celebrity segment, unlike other specials, while the second on 26 December, titled Top Gear: Middle East Special, was a feature-length special with the presenters travelling across the Middle East on a festive trip. The sixteenth series faced some criticism for comments regarding Mexicans and stereotypical views of Albanians.

Episodes

Criticism and Controversy

Mexican Slurs comments
Following the broadcast of the second episode of Series 16, controversy arose from the episode's News segment and the discussion between the presenters about Mexico's first supercar. During the discussion, two of the hosts described Mexicans as being lazy and that no-one would complain because they were all too busy sleeping, provoking the Mexican ambassador, Eduardo Medina Mora, to accuse the presenters of resorting to "outrageous, vulgar and inexcusable insults to stir bigoted feelings against the Mexican people", while stating that the remarks were offensive, xenophobic and humiliating and reinforced negative stereotypes of Mexican people. While the BBC defended the presenters anti-Mexican jokes, it apologised about some of the remarks made. Comedian Steve Coogan, however, criticised the programme for its pitiful apology following the broadcast, suggesting that the usual defence of "a bit of a laugh", or "harmless fun" was no longer appropriate, that the insults had gone too far, and described the comments as being "as funny as a cold sweat followed by shooting pains down the left arm". However, Mastretta appeared to have brushed off the insults, with general director Carlos Mastretta clarifying that the car was simply used as a pretext for the jokes, and that the controversy has increased interest in the MXT.

The Mexican comments were cut when the episode was broadcast in the United States and when the episodes were put on the BBC iPlayer.

Albanian Road Trip film
After the third episode of Series 16 was aired, the BBC received several complaints in regards to the road trip film, in which the presenters were finding a car suitable for the "Albanian Mafia". A number of complaints were directed to a segment of the film in which the presenters 'murdered' a fat Albanian and attempted to find out which of three car boots he would fit into the best, while the stereotypical views that Albania was a nest for mafia car thieves, were also criticised.

Notes
The viewing figures shown in the Episode Table above, are a combination of the figures from the BBC Two broadcast and the BBC HD broadcast.

References

2010 British television seasons
2011 British television seasons
Top Gear seasons